Staack Nunatak is a nunatak lying 1 nautical mile (1.9 km) west of Horner Nunatak, being one of several scattered and somewhat isolated nunataks located 40 nautical miles (70 km) north of the Merrick Mountains, in Palmer Land. Mapped by United States Geological Survey (USGS) from surveys and U.S. Navy air photos, 1961–67. Named by Advisory Committee on Antarctic Names (US-ACAN) for Karl J. Staack, meteorologist at Byrd Station, summer 1965–66.

Nunataks of Palmer Land